Harutaeographa diffusa is a moth of the family Noctuidae. It is found in Pakistan and Nepal.

References

Moths described in 1994
Orthosiini